Milton Keynes North is a constituency represented in the House of Commons of the UK Parliament since the 2019 United Kingdom general election by Ben Everitt, a Conservative.

Constituency profile 
The seat covers Central Milton Keynes and areas to the north including Wolverton, Newport Pagnell and Olney. Milton Keynes North has a higher average income, less social housing and less rented housing than the national average.

History
This constituency (and its counterpart, Milton Keynes South), came into being when the two Milton Keynes constituencies (Milton Keynes North East and Milton Keynes South West) were reconfigured following the Boundary Commission's Fifth Periodic Review of Westminster constituencies with the aim of equalising the electorate as between the constituencies in the light of population growth that had occurred mainly in the Milton Keynes Urban Area. This constituency is the more rural of the two.

Mark Lancaster, who had been the incumbent for Milton Keynes North East, won the new constituency for the Conservatives in the 2010 general election and retained it in the 2015 general election. He stood down before the 2019 general election after abuse and two threats to his life. His successor to the Conservative candidacy was Ben Everitt.

Boundaries

The constituency takes up the majority of the area of the City of Milton Keynes and is one of the borough's two constituencies. Milton Keynes North has a larger rural area; the other, Milton Keynes South, covers a smaller area and is more urban.

At its creation the constituency comprised the electoral wards of Bradwell, Campbell Park, Hanslope Park, Linford North, Linford South, Middleton, Newport Pagnell North, Newport Pagnell South, Olney, Sherington, Stantonbury, and Wolverton.

Following a revision to the ward boundaries in 2013, the seat comprises part or all of the following Council electoral wards:

 Bradwell
 Broughton
 Central Milton Keynes
 Campbell Park & Old Woughton
 Monkston
 Newport Pagnell North & Hanslope
 Newport Pagnell South
 Olney
 Stantonbury
 Wolverton

The City Council ward boundaries do not necessarily coincide with the town and parish council areas.

Of these wards, Newport Pagnell North & Hanslope and Olney are more rural. The remainder are more urban. Each ward returns three Councillors so their electorates are broadly equal.

Members of Parliament

Elections

Elections in the 2010s

See also
List of parliamentary constituencies in Buckinghamshire
Milton Keynes South

Notes

References

External links
United Kingdom Parliament
Boundary Commission for England
UK Polling Report Milton Keynes North

Parliamentary constituencies in Buckinghamshire
Constituencies of the Parliament of the United Kingdom established in 2010
Politics of Milton Keynes